Events from the year 1455 in England.

Incumbents
 Monarch – Henry VI
 Lord Chancellor – Thomas Bourchier
 Lord Privy Seal – Thomas Lisieux

Events
 May – The garrison of English Calais mutinies over pay arrears.
 22 May – Richard, Duke of York defeats the army of Henry VI at the First Battle of St Albans. Henry is captured, marking the beginning of the Wars of the Roses.
 23 October – Bonville–Courtenay feud in Devon: Thomas Courtenay, heir to the Earl of Devon, arranges the murder of lawyer Nicholas Radford.
 19 November – The Duke of York is reinstated as Lord Protector, acting as regent for the King.
 November–December –  Bonville–Courtenay feud leads to continued rioting and rebellion in Devon including sacking of Exeter.
 15 December – The first battle of Clyst Heath is fought as part of the Bonville–Courtenay feud
 Unknown – Earliest known reference to knitting in England.
 Unknown – The Importation Act is passed in order to protect the English silk industry

Births
 Marquess of Dorset, nobleman and courtier (died 1501)
 John Spencer, landowner (died 1522)

Deaths
 John Scrope, 4th Baron Scrope of Masham, politician (born 1388)
 Thomas de Strickland, soldier (born 1367)
 At the First Battle of St Albans (22 May)
Henry Percy, 2nd Earl of Northumberland, politician (born 1393)
 Edmund Beaufort, 2nd Duke of Somerset, commander (born 1406)
Humphrey Stafford, Earl of Stafford (born 1425)

References

 
Years of the 15th century in England